Marcus Evans (10 November 1878 – 1 June 1955) was an  Australian rules footballer who played with Essendon in the Victorian Football League (VFL).

Notes

External links 
		

1878 births
1955 deaths
Australian rules footballers from Victoria (Australia)
Essendon Football Club players